"I Breathe Again" is the debut single of English singer and former Coronation Street actor Adam Rickitt. The single peaked at number five on the UK Singles Chart, selling 76,500 copies and stayed on the chart for 10 weeks. Outside the United Kingdom, "I Breathe Again" peaked at number nine in Hungary and number 16 in Ireland. 

A music video for the song, was released to promote the single. Some scenes in which he appears naked surprised some fans. On his official website he said: "I had boxers on for part of it but in some of the camera angles you could see them. The director asked if I'd go starkers for some of the shots and I agreed. I wasn't getting off the floor for anything after that. I dread to think where the off-shoots went. They're probably with one of those When They Were Famous film companies!"

Track listings

UK CD1
 "I Breathe Again"
 "Stars Are Falling"
 "The True Confessions of Adam Rickitt" (interview)
 "I Breathe Again" (video)

UK CD2
 "I Breathe Again" (radio edit)
 "I Breathe Again" (Amen extended mix)
 "I Breathe Again" (The Sharp Boys extended remix)

UK cassette single
 "I Breathe Again"
 "I Breathe Again" (Jewels & Stone extended mix)

Japanese CD single
 "I Breathe Again"
 "I Breathe Again" (Amen extended mix)
 "I Breathe Again" (The Sharp Boys extended remix)
 "I Breathe Again" (Jewels & Stone extended mix)

Charts

Weekly charts

Year-end charts

Certifications and sales

References

External links
 Music video on YouTube

1999 debut singles
1999 songs
Hi-NRG songs
Polydor Records singles
Songs written by Julian Gingell